Wild Man on the Loose is an album by Mose Allison, recorded for the Atlantic label in 1965.

Reception

AllMusic awarded the album 3 stars with its review by Eugene Chadbourne stating, "The lion's share of recordings by this artist are in a piano trio setting, and this mid-'60s session finds him working with one of the best combinations he ever had. ...Vocal performances are smooth as always, although the set does not contain any totally classic numbers".

Track listing
All compositions by Mose Allison except as indicated
 "Wild Man on the Loose" – 2:06
 "No Trouble Livin'" – 2:17
 "Night Watch" – 4:34
 "What's with You" – 2:55
 "Power House" – 5:00
 "You Can Count on Me to Do My Part" – 2:11
 "Never More" – 4:27
 "That's the Stuff You Gotta Watch" (Buddy Johnson) – 2:12
 "War Horse" – 6:59

Personnel 
Mose Allison – piano, vocals
Earl May – bass 
Paul Motian – drums

References 

1965 albums
Mose Allison albums
Atlantic Records albums
Albums produced by Nesuhi Ertegun
Albums produced by Arif Mardin